, is a Japanese idol who is a former member NMB48's Team BII and former member of AKB48. She is a cousin of Berryz Kobo
sub- captain Miyabi Natsuyaki.

Fujie is represented with Itoh Company.

NMB48/AKB48 discography

Singles
 NMB48

 AKB48

Albums
 NMB48

 AKB48

Stage units
 AKB48

 NMB48

Works

Videos

Filmography

TV dramas

Other TV programmes
 Current appearances

 Former appearances

Films

Radio

Radio dramas

Stage

Musicals

Events

Music videos

Others

Bibliography

Photobooks

Magazine serials

Calendars

E-book

References

Notes

Sources

External links
NMB48 official profile 
Itoh Company official profile 
Yome Colle... official site 
Reina Fujie on Showroom 

NMB48
AKB48 members
Japanese idols
Musicians from Chiba Prefecture
1994 births
Living people
21st-century Japanese women singers
21st-century Japanese singers
21st-century Japanese actresses